The Hamoodur Rahman Commission Report (or War Report) contains the Government of Pakistan's official and classified papers of the events leading up to loss of East Pakistan and the 1971 war with India.  Initially, there were 12 copies of the report prepared by the Chief Justice Hamoodur Rahman; all were destroyed except one. That single report was handed over to the government, which forbade its publication at the time. The report was leaked eventually by the Indian and the Pakistani newspapers, including Dawn, drawing the attention of the public to its front pages in 2000. An editorial entitled, "Gen Agha Mohammad Yahya Khan - 4" written by Ardeshir Cowasjee on the basis of the Hamoodur Rahman Commission Report, demonstrated that "three men principally (had been) responsible for the loss, at the end of 1971, of half of Jinnah's Pakistan— end of story."

Originally, it was thought that the Government of Pakistan had declassified the Report in 2002 and was made it available to the public as public domain whereas it was free to download on the internet. However, it was reported to be a "Supplementary Report" which was created after the prisoners of war returned after two years. The First Report has never been published nor is it accessible to anyone.

See also
 Classified information in Pakistan

References

1972 in Pakistan
2000 in Pakistan
Classified documents
Indo-Pakistani War of 1971
Whistleblowing
Dawn (newspaper)
Reports of the Government of Pakistan
Government of Pakistan secrecy
1972 documents